Flatline may mean:

 Flatline, an electrical time sequence measurement that shows no activity. Thus:
 In heart function, asystole
 In brain function, a flat electroencephalogram, where the brain shows no electrical activity (brain death)

Music
 Flatline (album), a 1997 album by MC Breed
 "Flatline" (B.o.B song), 2016
 "Flatline" (Mutya Keisha Siobhan song), 2013, re-released in 2022
 "Flatline" (Nelly Furtado song), 2017
 "Flatline", a song by 5 Seconds Of Summer from 5SOS5
 "Flatline", a song by Justin Bieber from Journals

Other
 "Flatline" (Doctor Who), 2014 TV episode
 Flatline, Tippmann company's Flatline Barrel System for paintball
 Flatlining, budget freeze
 Flatline (Transformers), a fictional character in the Transformers universe
 Flatline (drink), a shot made from sambuca, tequila and Tabasco sauce

See also
 Flatliner (disambiguation)
 Flat (disambiguation)